A B M Musa (28 February 19319 April 2014) was a Bengali journalist. He was the chief editor of Bangladesh Sangbad Sangstha (BSS). He was awarded Ekushey Padak for journalism in 1999 by the Government of Bangladesh.

Education
Musa was born in Feni District in on 28 February 1931. He was educated in Chittagong Government Moslem High School, Noakhali Zila School, Comilla Victoria Government College and Choumohoni College. In Choumohoni College he first got into journalism as an editor of the College newspaper Koifoyot.

Career
Musa started his career as a journalist in 1950 with the then Daily Insaf. He moved to the daily Pakistan Observer in the same year. He was a founder of Pakistan Journalists Union and elected general secretary of the then East Pakistan Journalists Union.

Musa was a correspondent of BBC and Sunday Times during the Liberation War of Bangladesh in 1971. He was one of the founder members of Jatiya Press Club. In 1971 he joined Bangladesh Television (BTV) as its Director General. He was also the editor of the then Morning News. Musa worked in Bangladesh Sangbad Sangstha (BSS), Bangladesh's national news agency, as its managing director and chief editor from May 1985 to March 1987. Later in his life he worked as the editor of Daily Jugantor during 2004–05.

Musa was an elected Member of Parliament (MP) from Feni constituency in 1973 as an Awami League candidate.

Personal life
Musa was married to Setara Musa. They had one son Nasim Musa and three daughters namely Mariam Sultana Musa Ruma, Parveen Sultana Musa Jhuma and Dr Sharmin Musa

References

1931 births
2014 deaths
Bangladeshi journalists
Awami League politicians
Recipients of the Ekushey Padak
People from Fulgazi Upazila
Honorary Fellows of Bangla Academy
Comilla Victoria Government College alumni
1st Jatiya Sangsad members